Jack of Spades (French: Chien de pique) is a 1960 French drama film directed by Yves Allégret and starring Eddie Constantine, Raymond Pellegrin and Marie Versini.

Synopsis
A retired gangster settles down on a ranch to raise cattle. However, his former life comes back to pursue him.

Cast
 Eddie Constantine as Patrick  
 Raymond Pellegrin as Robert  
 Marie Versini as Zita  
 Georges Douking as Le vieux Manuel  
 Henri Cogan as Un guardian  
 Pierre Clémenti as Paco 
 Moustache as Le patron du café 
 Jean-Marc Allègre as Un riziculteur  
 James Campbell 
 Guy Estève 
 François Périer 
 Jean Roux 
 Francis San Juan

References

Bibliography 
 Maurice Bessy & Raymond Chirat. Histoire du cinéma français: 1956-1960. Pygmalion, 1990.

External links 
 

1960 drama films
French drama films
1960 films
1960s French-language films
Films directed by Yves Allégret
1960s French films